Rosina was launched at Shields in 1796. She became a West Indiaman and foundered in 1806.

Career
Rosina first appeared in Lloyd's Register (LR) in 1799 with M'Kinley master, Old & Co., owners, and trade London–West Indies.

The Register of Shipping for 1806 showed her with M'Kinley, master, Olds & Co., owner, and trade London transport. The entry carried the annotation "Lost".

Fate
Lloyd's List reported on 14 February 1806 that Rosina, M'Kinley, master, had foundered on her return journey to England from Surinam.  rescued the crew and took them into Milford.

Citations

1796 ships
Age of Sail merchant ships of England
Maritime incidents in 1806
Shipwrecks in the Atlantic Ocean